The Communauté de communes Avre Luce Noye is a communauté de communes in the Somme département and in the Hauts-de-France région of France. It was formed on 1 January 2017 by the merger of the former Communauté de communes Avre Luce Moreuil and the Communauté de communes du Val de Noye. Its seat is in Moreuil. Its area is 385.2 km2, and its population was 21,883 in 2019.

Composition
The communauté de communes consists of the following 47 communes:

Ailly-sur-Noye
Arvillers
Aubercourt
Aubvillers
Beaucourt-en-Santerre
Berteaucourt-lès-Thennes
Braches
Cayeux-en-Santerre
Chaussoy-Epagny
Chirmont
Cottenchy
Coullemelle
Démuin
Domart-sur-la-Luce
Dommartin
Esclainvillers
La Faloise
Flers-sur-Noye
Folleville
Fouencamps
Fransures
Fresnoy-en-Chaussée
Grivesnes
Guyencourt-sur-Noye
Hailles
Hallivillers
Hangard
Hangest-en-Santerre
Ignaucourt
Jumel
Lawarde-Mauger-l'Hortoy
Louvrechy
Mailly-Raineval
Mézières-en-Santerre
Moreuil
Morisel
La Neuville-Sire-Bernard
Le Plessier-Rozainvillers
Le Quesnel
Quiry-le-Sec
Rogy
Rouvrel
Sauvillers-Mongival
Sourdon
Thennes
Thory
Villers-aux-Érables

References 

Avre-Luce-Noye
Avre-Luce-Noye